This article contains information about the literary events and publications of 1575.

Events

July – Sir Philip Sidney meets Penelope Devereux, the inspiration for his Astrophel and Stella.
September 26 – Miguel de Cervantes is captured by Barbary pirates.
unknown date
The first primer in the Estonian language is published.
First printed version of Don Juan Manuel's Tales of Count Lucanor appears. It was originally written in 1335.

New books

Prose
Anonymous – Arbatel de magia veterum
Ulpian Fulwell – The Flower of Fame (appendices in verse)

Drama
George Gascoigne – The Glass of Government

Poetry

Veronica Franco – Terze rime

Births
April – Jakob Böhme, German theologian (died 1624)
August 14 – Robert Hayman, Newfoundland poet (died 1624)
August 15 – Bartol Kašić, Croatian linguist (died 1650)
Unknown dates
David Calderwood, Scottish historian (died 1650)
John Cotta, English physician and writer (died 1650)
Giovanni Stefano Menochio, Italian Jesuit scholar (died 1655)
Cyril Tourneur, English dramatist (died 1626)
William Vaughan, Welsh writer and colonist (died 1641)

Deaths
March 11 – Matthias Flacius, Croatian theologian writing in Latin (born 1520)
June 9 – Paulus Aemilius, Hebrew bibliographer and publisher
July 14 – Richard Taverner, English Bible translator (born c. 1505)
August 14 – Diego Hurtado de Mendoza, Spanish novelist and poet (born 1503)
September 17 – Heinrich Bullinger, Swiss theologian (born 1504)
December 1 – Diogo de Paiva de Andrada, Portuguese theologian (born 1528)
December 18 – Marcin Bielski, Polish chronicler and poet (born 1495)
unknown dates
Sir William Stevenson, English poet (born 1530)
Isabel de Josa, Catalan writer (born 1508)

References

Years of the 16th century in literature